Galia Angelova (born 10 November 1972) is a Bulgarian former professional tennis player.

Biography
Angelova, who comes from Haskovo, was a member of the Bulgaria Federation Cup team which competed in the 1988 and 1990 competitions, featuring in a total of eight ties. Her only WTA Tour main draw appearance came in the doubles at the 1989 Vitosha New Otani Open in Sofia. She won three ITF singles titles and had a best ranking of 378 in the world. As a doubles player she was ranked as high as 231 and won five ITF doubles titles.

She is now a tennis coach and works at Dema Sport in Sofia.

ITF Circuit finals

Singles: 4 (3 titles, 1 runner–up)

Doubles: 9 (5 titles, 4 runner–ups)

References

External links
 
 
 

1972 births
Living people
Bulgarian female tennis players
People from Haskovo
Sportspeople from Haskovo Province